Futura Gael was an airline based in Dublin, Ireland, wholly owned by Futura International Airways, operating charter flights to Mediterranean countries, Eastern Europe and Egypt.

History 
Futura Gael was set up by Futura International Airways in order to get the necessary traffic rights to operate charter flights from Ireland to destinations outside the European Union. The airline operated charter flights to the Mediterranean and Eastern Europe.

During 2008, Futura Gael was reported to have planned cutbacks in staffing and wages and had been trying to make a deal with its creditors; specifically, management suggested that all employee salaries be cut to €1000 a month.

Incident
On 7 September 2008, a Futura Gael flight bound for Málaga, Spain was delayed at Dublin Airport for nearly three hours before it finally took off just before 10pm. The airline officially ceased operations at midnight on the 8 September 2008.

Livery
The airline's aircraft had the standard Futura livery with a decal citing "Gael" on the forward section.

Fleet 
The Futura Gael fleet consisted of the following aircraft (at 8 September 2008):
1 Boeing 737-400
2 Boeing 737-800

References

External links

Defunct airlines of the Republic of Ireland
Airlines established in 2007
Airlines disestablished in 2008
Irish companies established in 2007